Norwegian accent(s) may refer to:
 Norwegian phonology, the sounds used in the Norwegian language
 Norwegian dialects, the different varieties found in the Norwegian language
 a non-native English variety spoken by Norwegians and Norwegian speakers